M Clan is a Spanish rock band. The band, initially named Murciélagos Clan, was formed in Murcia, (Spain) in 1992 by Carlos Tarque and Ricardo Ruipérez. 

In March 1993 the band added Santiago Campillo, Pascual Saura, Juan Otero and Íñigo Uribe, under the name '', (The Clan of Bats), which soon became 'M-Clan'. The band's sound was heavily influenced by Southern rock artists. The group currently consists of Carlos Tarque (vocals), Juan Antonio Otero, Ricardo Ruipérez (guitar), Carlos Raya (guitar), Pascual Saura, and Alejandro Climent 'Boli' (keyboard). 

The band's 1999 release  went platinum, leading to the release of their 2001 Unplugged album . The band released  in 2004 under Warner Bros. and Eastwest Records.

Discography
  (1995)
  (1997)
  (1999)
  (Unplugged) (2001)
  (2002)
  (2004)
  (1995-2006)
  (2008)
  (2010)
  (2012)
  (2014)
 Delta (2016)

External links

 Official website
M-Clan photographs in Todomusicaymas Live in Bilbao 2008

Spanish rock music groups
Southern rock musical groups
Rock en Español music groups